The Keuper Waterstones is a geologic formation in England. It preserves ichnofossils of Varanopus aff. curvidactylus, Swinnertonichnus mapperleyensis, Deuterotetrapous plancus, Chirotherium swinnertoni, Microsauropus acutipes and Erpetopus willistoni dating back to the Middle Triassic (Anisian) period.

See also 
 List of fossiliferous stratigraphic units in England

References

Further reading 
 W. A. S. Sarjeant. 1967. Fossil footprints from the Middle Triassic of Nottinghamshire and Derbyshire. The Mercian Geologist 2:327-341
 H. H. Swinnerton. 1910. Organic remains in the Trias of Nottingham. Geological Magazine, decade 5 7(5):229

Geologic formations of England
Triassic System of Europe
Triassic England
Anisian Stage
Sandstone formations
Geology of Nottinghamshire